Toronto was an electoral district of the Legislative Assembly of the Parliament of the Province of Canada, in Canada West (now Ontario). It was created in 1841, upon the establishment of the Province of Canada by the union of Upper Canada and Lower Canada. Toronto was represented by two members in the Legislative Assembly.  It was abolished in 1867, upon the creation of Canada and the province of Ontario.

Boundaries 

Toronto electoral district was based on the municipal boundaries of Old Toronto, as they existed in 1841.

The Union Act, 1840 had merged the two provinces of Upper Canada and Lower Canada into the Province of Canada, with a single Parliament.  The separate parliaments of Lower Canada and Upper Canada were abolished.Union Act, 1840, 3 & 4 Vict. (UK), c. 35, s. 2.   The Union Act provided that the city of Toronto would constitute one electoral district in the Legislative Assembly of the new Parliament, with two members.

The Act gave the Governor General of the Province of Canada the power to draw the boundaries for the electoral district.  The first Governor General, Lord Sydenham, issued a proclamation shortly after the formation of the Province of Canada in early 1841, establishing the boundaries for the electoral district.  The boundaries were based largely on the municipal boundaries of Toronto as it existed in 1841.

Members of the Legislative Assembly 

Toronto was represented by two members in the Legislative Assembly. The following were the members for Toronto.

Notes

Abolition 

Toronto electoral district was abolished on July 1, 1867, when the British North America Act, 1867 came into force, creating Canada and splitting the Province of Canada into Quebec and Ontario.  The district was succeeded by two federal electoral districts, East Toronto and West Toronto in the House of Commons of Canada and by two provincial electoral districts with the same names in the Legislative Assembly of Ontario.

References 

Electoral districts of Canada West